Dzmitry Platonaw (born 7 February 1986) is a retired Belarusian footballer midfielder. He is a twin brother of Pavel Platonaw.

Career
He played for BATE Borisov in the preliminary rounds of the 2006-07 UEFA Cup and the 2007-08 UEFA Champions League.

Honours
BATE Borisov
Belarusian Premier League champion: 2006, 2007
Belarusian Cup winner: 2005–06

Gomel
Belarusian Cup winner: 2010–11
Belarusian Super Cup winner: 2012

Torpedo-BelAZ Zhodino
Belarusian Cup winner: 2015–16

Spartaks Jūrmala
Latvian Higher League champion: 2016, 2017

References

1986 births
Living people
Belarusian twins
Twin sportspeople
Belarusian footballers
Belarusian expatriate footballers
Belarusian expatriate sportspeople in Latvia
Expatriate footballers in Latvia
FC Energetik-BGU Minsk players
FC BATE Borisov players
FC Granit Mikashevichi players
FC Shakhtyor Soligorsk players
FC Gomel players
FC Torpedo-BelAZ Zhodino players
FK Spartaks Jūrmala players
FK RFS players
Association football midfielders
Footballers from Minsk